Kuryanikha is a rural locality (a village) in Zadneselskoye Rural Settlement, Ust-Kubinsky  District, Vologda Oblast, Russia. The population was 50 as of 2002.

Geography 
Kuryanikha is located 33 km north of Ustye (the district's administrative centre) by road. Korolikha is the nearest rural locality.

References 

Rural localities in Tarnogsky District